Frank Herzog is a former American sportscaster known for his role as a play-by-play announcer for Washington Redskins radio broadcasts from 1979 to 2004, where he teamed with Sam Huff and Sonny Jurgensen.

In addition to his Redskins work, Herzog called games for the Washington Bullets, Maryland Terrapins basketball, and college football and basketball on the CBS network.  He also worked for a number of Washington, D.C.-area television stations including WTOP, WJLA, and WUSA.  Herzog also has had minor parts in a few films, including 2009's State of Play, starring Russell Crowe and Ben Affleck.

He retired from his news anchor job with WTOP radio in March 2010.

Filmography
Step Up (2006) - Judge Milton
National Treasure: Book of Secrets (2007) - Frank
State of Play (2009) - Congressman Johnson (uncredited) (final film role)

References

External links

Year of birth missing (living people)
Living people
American radio sports announcers
College basketball announcers in the United States
College football announcers
National Basketball Association broadcasters
National Football League announcers
Washington Bullets announcers
Television anchors from Washington, D.C.
Washington Redskins announcers